The HiFive Unleashed, or HFU is a single-board computer development board created by SiFive with the intention to increase exposure and adoption of the open-source RISC-V architecture.

The HFU is capable of running the Debian Linux distribution and Quake II.

References

Single-board computers